Charles Chilton Moore (December 20, 1837 – February 7, 1906) was an American atheist, and the editor of the Blue Grass Blade, one of the United States' first newspapers promoting atheism. Due to his criticisms of religion, he was dubbed Kentucky's Most Hated Man.

Early life

Moore's grandfather was the 19th century religious reformer Barton W. Stone. Moore became a preacher, in his grandfather's tradition, but came to doubt the Bible and its teachings.  He left the church, passing through deism and agnosticism before becoming an atheist.  He founded the Blue Grass Blade in 1884 in Lexington, Kentucky.  Due to financial and legal problems, he was only able to publish it sporadically.  The journal contained articles advocating such positions as agnosticism, women's suffrage, and prohibition.

Atheist activism
Moore spent time in prison for his outspoken opposition to religion and the Bible.  In February 1899, he was indicted for mailing obscene literature through the mail - a federal crime.  The obscene literature in question was a discussion about free love that Moore had engaged in with a local judge in the pages of the Blade, but merely printing such a taboo conversation was enough to get him into a courthouse and set another historical precedent for the First Amendment.  Moore, not wanting to burden his family financially, decided to defend himself in court.  He would come to regret his decision when the district attorney managed to direct the jury's attention from Moore's mailing of lewd content to his atheism and the many articles of blasphemy in his newspaper.  Moore's hopelessness was evident when he tried to convince a jury of twelve Christians that he, an atheist, was innocent.  Though he was indicted for mailing obscene literature, it was his blasphemy that led the jury to deliberate for five minutes before returning with a guilty verdict. The next morning, the judge heeded Moore's plea to not impose a monetary penalty and instead sentenced him to two years in the Ohio State Penitentiary. Before Moore's friends at the Ohio Liberal Society could file his appeal, he was whisked away to the penitentiary.  The Ohio Liberal Society and an African-American newspaper, The Lexington Standard, edited by R. C. O. Benjamin, fought for Moore's release. There is no indication which group managed to be successful in their efforts, but Ohio's former governor, President William McKinley, ended up commuting Moore's sentence to six months, with one month off for good behavior.  Moore was released from prison in July 1899. His autobiography, mostly written in prison, is called Behind the Bars; 31498.

Illness and death

Moore died at his homestead, Quaker Acre, just outside Lexington, on February 7, 1906, after a long illness.  News accounts declared that thousands attended his funeral.  Orations were given by J.B. Wilson of Cincinnati, President of the National Liberal Party, noted suffragist Josephine K. Henry, and close friend Moses Kaufman.  Rumors of a deathbed conversion made a few newspapers, but many quoted his wife as saying that Moore had died as he had lived.  His publisher, James Edward Hughes, ensured the Blue Grass Blade survived him and in January 1908 it became a 16-page magazine featuring portraits and photographs of prominent and local freethinkers, scientists, and skeptics on the cover until budget constraints forced it to revert to text in May 1909.  The following December, more money woes led the Blade to degrade to its original 4-page format.  The last known issue of Blue Grass Blade was published on August 21, 1910.

Moore is buried in Lexington, Kentucky. His epitaph reads: "Write me as one who loves his fellow man."

Legacy
Moore's legacy is that of a father of American atheism.  His Blue Grass Blade was widely circulated, gaining him notoriety among the religious and non-religious alike.  He helped to promote arguments against much that is contained in the Bible, for example, geological evidence that Earth existed far before the date of October 23, 4004 BC, calculated by James Ussher from the Old Testament.  His legal trials helped establish precedents in free speech law, as it relates to religious dissent.

In 1984, 100 years following the first publication of the Blue Grass Blade, Madalyn Murray O'Hair and other atheist activists planted a "Devil's Hosta" lily which still sits on Moore's headstone to this day. O'Hair's organization, American Atheists, later republished his book The Rational View and his autobiography Behind the Bars, in 1984 and 1990 respectively.

Books written by Moore

 The Rational View
 Behind the Bars; 31498 (1889)
 Dog Fennel in the Orient (1903)
Tamám (1908) The Neale Publishing Company

Recent mentions

 Kentucky's Most Hated Man: Charles Chilton Moore & The Bluegrass Blade, a biography, written by John Sparks, was published in the summer of 2009.
 Biology professor and atheist, PZ Myers, mentioned Moore on his popular blog, Pharyngula, on March 4, 2010.
 Hemant Mehta mentioned C.C. Moore on his blog, Friendly Atheist, on April 28, 2011, using Watson Heston's Rationalism Is Not Dead to start a conversation about how the so-called New Atheism at the beginning of the 21st century is not very new at all.
 Daniel Fincke, of the blog Camels with Hammers, mentioned Moore and the Blue Grass Blade on September 20, 2011, and again on September 28 after hearing about Thomas Lawson's Letters from an Atheist Nation, which was being published at the same time.
 PZ Myers mentioned the Camels with Hammers post and commented on Moore on his blog, Pharyngula, on September 28, 2011.
 Letters from an Atheist Nation: Godless Voices of America in 1903, by Thomas Lawson, features a short biography of Moore and the Blade. It also includes a compilation of letters written by Blade readers detailing their reasons for becoming atheists. It was published as an eBook on Amazon.com on September 25, 2011, and in paperback on December 13, 2011.
 On October 9, 2011, PZ Myers, upon reading Thomas Lawson's Letters from an Atheist Nation, decided to emulate Moore by asking for submissions from his readers as to why they are atheists, just as the Blue Grass Blade did in April 1903.

See also
List of people pardoned or granted clemency by the president of the United States

References

Additional sources
 Kentucky's Most Hated Man: Charles Chilton Moore & The Bluegrass Blade, a biography by John Sparks
 Biography of Charles Chilton Moore
 Blue Grass Blade Digital Editions at the Library of Congress
 Digital Editions of Blue Grass Blade at Kentuckiana Digital Library - written account of Moore's trial in the February 19, 1899, edition
 The Kentucky Encyclopedia (1992) - John E. Kleber
 Letters from an Atheist Nation, a compilation of letters from American atheists in 1903, collected by Thomas Lawson

1837 births
1906 deaths
19th-century atheists
20th-century atheists
19th-century American writers
20th-century American non-fiction writers
American atheism activists
American newspaper editors
American former Christians
American male non-fiction writers
People convicted of blasphemy
Writers from Lexington, Kentucky
Recipients of American presidential pardons
American atheist writers
Free speech activists
Critics of religions
Critics of creationism
Free love advocates
Stone family
19th-century American Episcopalians
20th-century American male writers